Hellingen is a village and a former municipality in the region Heldburger Land in the district of Hildburghausen, in Thuringia, Germany. Since 1 January 2019, it is part of the town Heldburg. It was the southernmost municipality in Thuringia, and the second-southernmost in what was formerly East Germany (following Bad Brambach in Saxony).

History
Within the German Empire (1871-1918), Hellingen was part of the Duchy of Saxe-Coburg and Gotha.

Culture
Hellingen has got one of the last monuments dedicated to Lenin in Germany: a memorial stone placed in the Schiller Platz in 1970.

References
Norbert Klaus Fuchs: Das Heldburger Land – ein historischer Reiseführer (The Land of Heldburg – a Historical Guide); Bad Langensalza, Verlag Rockstuhl, 2013, 

Former municipalities in Thuringia
Hildburghausen (district)
Saxe-Coburg and Gotha